The Vestfold Hills are rounded, rocky, coastal hills,  in extent, on the north side of Sorsdal Glacier on the Ingrid Christensen Coast of Princess Elizabeth Land, Antarctica. The hills are subdivided by three west-trending peninsulas bounded by narrow fjords.

Geography
The Vestfold Hills are largely snow and ice-free and are thus classified as an Antarctic oasis. They contain a great variety of lake systems with over 300 lakes and ponds including what is possibly the largest concentration of meromictic (stratified) lakes in the world. This region contains 37 permanently stratified water bodies, including six marine basins and seven seasonally isolated marine basins (SIMBs). These stratified basins also have great variety. The region contains a large lake, Lake Burton, as well as the smaller Krok Lake and Camp Lake.

History and naming
The Vestfold Hills were discovered and a landing was made in the northern portion on February 20, 1935, by Captain Klarius Mikkelsen together with his wife and seven crew members (including the ship's dentist, Lief Sørsdal) of the Norwegian whaling ship "Thorshavn" sent out by Lars Christensen. Caroline Mikkelsen thereby became the first woman to set foot on the Antarctic continent.

The Vestfold Hills are named after Vestfold, a county in Norway where Sandefjord, headquarters of the whaling industry, is located. This hill area and its off-lying islands were mapped from air photos taken by the Lars Christensen Expedition (1936–37). Further brief landings were made by Lincoln Ellsworth and several claims were made by Hubert Wilkins in 1939. The area was photographed from the air by USN Operation Highjump (1946–47). Landings were made and exploration carried out in 1954 and 1955 by ANARE (Australian National Antarctic Research Expeditions) led by Phillip Law. Davis Station was established by ANARE in January 1957.

Further reading 
 Beau Riffenburgh, Encyclopedia of the Antarctic, Volume 1, P 680 
  Johanna Laybourn-Parry, Jemma L. Wadham, Antarctic Lakes, PP 92 - 93 
 DAMIAN B. GORE, I. SNAPE and M.R. LEISHMAN, Glacial sediment provenance, dispersal and deposition, Vestfold Hills, East Antarctica, Antarctic Science 15 (2): 259–269 (2003),  DOI: 10.1017/S0954102003001263
 BROLSMA, HENK, Survey Report Vestfold Hills, Australian Antarctic Territory 1984-85, 1985-86 summer season, Australian Antarctic Data Centre
 P.H.G.M.Dirks, J.D.Hoek, C.J.L.Wilson, J.Sims, The Proterozoic deformation of the Vestfold Hills Block, East Antarctica: implications for the tectonic development of adjacent granulite belts, https://doi.org/10.1016/0301-9268(94)90109-0
 Kirkwood, J.M., Burton, H.R., Macrobenthic species assemblages in Ellis Fjord, Vestfold Hills, Antarctica, Mar. Biol. 97, 445–457 (1988). https://doi.org/10.1007/BF00397776
 Gibson, J. (1999), The role of ice in determining mixing intensity in Ellis Fjord, Vestfold Hills, East Antarctica, Antarctic Science, 11(4), 419-426. https://doi.org/10.1017/S095410209900053X
 Australian Antarctic Division, Locations of samples from Organic Lake, Deep Lake and Ellis Fjord in the Vestfold Hills, Antarctica, Dataset

External links 
 Vestfold Hills on USGS website
 Vestfold Hills on AADC website
 Vestfold Hills on SCAR website
 Visiting Vestfold Hills
 Vimeo video of Vestfold Hills

References

Hills of Princess Elizabeth Land
Oases of Antarctica
Ingrid Christensen Coast